Sam Tanenhaus (born October 31, 1955) is an American historian, biographer, and journalist.  He currently is a writer for Prospect.

Early years
Tanenhaus received his B.A. in English from Grinnell College in 1977 and a M.A. in English Literature from Yale University in 1978. His siblings include psycholinguist Michael Tanenhaus, filmmaker Beth Tanenhaus Winsten, and legal historian David S. Tanenhaus.

Career
Tanenhaus was an assistant editor at The New York Times from 1997 to 1999, and a contributing editor at Vanity Fair from 1999 until 2004. From April 2004 to April 2013 he served as the editor of The New York Times Book Review. He has written many featured articles for that publication, including a 10-year retrospective on the politics of radical centrism. His 1997 biography of Whittaker Chambers won the Los Angeles Times Book Prize and was a finalist for both the National Book Award for Nonfiction and the Pulitzer Prize for Biography. Since 2019, Tanenhaus has been a visiting professor at St. Michael's College in the University of Toronto, where he virtually teaches courses on American politics and media studies.

Personal life
Tanenhaus formerly lived in Tarrytown, New York with his wife. Currently, he resides in Essex, Connecticut.

Bibliography

References

External links

Will the Tea Get Cold? (March 8, 2012 New York Review of Books issue)
Interview with Sam Tanenhaus from  Oxford American
Sam Tanenhaus's review of "Freedom" by Jonathan Franzen in The New York Times Book Review
Sam Tanenhaus's review of "Going Rogue" by Sarah Palin in The New Yorker

21st-century American historians
21st-century American male writers
Radical centrist writers
The New York Times editors
1955 births
Place of birth missing (living people)
Living people
Grinnell College alumni
Yale University alumni
20th-century American journalists
American male journalists
American male non-fiction writers